The 1999–2000 NCAA Division I men's basketball season began on November 11, 1999, with the Coaches Vs. Cancer Classic, progressed through the regular season and conference tournaments, and concluded with the 2000 NCAA Division I men's basketball tournament championship game on April 3, 2000, at the RCA Dome in Indianapolis, Indiana.

Season headlines 
 Tom Izzo led Michigan State to its second National Championship behind the play of the "Flintstones," a trio of players from Flint, Michigan. Mateen Cleaves, Morris Peterson and Charlie Bell led the Spartans to an 89–76 win over Florida, with Cleaves named Final Four Most Outstanding Player and Peterson also making the All-Tournament team.
 Cincinnati was 28–2 and had been arguably the best team in the country when Player of the Year Kenyon Martin had a season-ending leg fracture three minutes into their first-round Conference USA tournament game against Saint Louis. The Bearcats lost that game and gave the NCAA Tournament selection committee a difficult decision to make about seeding. Ultimately, the Bearcats were made a #2 seed in the NCAA tournament and lost in the second round to Tulsa.
 The preseason AP All-American team was named on November 10. Chris Porter of Auburn was the leading vote-getter (53 of 65 votes). The rest of the team included Quentin Richardson of DePaul (46 votes), Mateen Cleaves of Michigan State (44), Scoonie Penn of Ohio State (44) and Terence Morris of Maryland (30).

Season outlook

Pre-season polls 
The top 25 from the AP Poll November 9, 1999 and the ESPN/USA Today Poll November 4, 1999.

Conference membership changes 

These schools joined new conferences for the 1999–2000 season.

Regular season

Conference winners and tournaments 

29 conference seasons concluded with a single-elimination tournament, with only the Ivy League or the Pac-10 choosing not to conduct conference tournaments. Conference tournament winners generally received an automatic bid to the NCAA tournament. The Mountain West Conference began operation in 1999-00 and their tournament winner did not receive an automatic bid (although UNLV, winners of the inaugural MWC tournament, did receive an at-large bid).

Statistical leaders

Post-season tournaments

NCAA tournament

Final Four – RCA Dome, Indianapolis, Indiana

National Invitation tournament

Semifinals & finals 

 Third Place – Penn State 74, N.C. State 72

Award winners

Consensus All-American teams

Major player of the year awards 
 Wooden Award: Kenyon Martin, Cincinnati
 Naismith Award: Kenyon Martin, Cincinnati
 Associated Press Player of the Year: Kenyon Martin, Cincinnati
 NABC Player of the Year: Kenyon Martin, Cincinnati
 Oscar Robertson Trophy (USBWA): Kenyon Martin, Cincinnati
 Adolph Rupp Trophy: Kenyon Martin, Cincinnati
 Sporting News Player of the Year: Kenyon Martin, Cincinnati

Major freshman of the year awards 
 USBWA Freshman of the Year: Jason Gardner, Arizona
 'Sporting News Freshman of the Year: Jason Williams, Duke

 Major coach of the year awards 
 Associated Press Coach of the Year: Larry Eustachy, Iowa State
 Henry Iba Award (USBWA): Larry Eustachy, Iowa State
 NABC Coach of the Year: Gene Keady, Purdue
 Naismith College Coach of the Year: Mike Montgomery, Stanford
 CBS/Chevrolet Coach of the Year: Mike Krzyzewski, Duke
 Sporting News Coach of the Year: Bob Huggins, Cincinnati & Bill Self, Tulsa

 Other major awards 
 Pete Newell Big Man Award (Best big man): Marcus Fizer, Iowa State
 NABC Defensive Player of the Year: Shane Battier, Duke & Kenyon Martin, Cincinnati
 Frances Pomeroy Naismith Award (Best player under 6'0): Scoonie Penn, Ohio State
 Robert V. Geasey Trophy (Top player in Philadelphia Big 5): Pepe Sanchez, Temple
 NIT/Haggerty Award (Top player in New York City metro area): Craig "Speedy" Claxton, Hofstra
 Chip Hilton Player of the Year Award (Strong personal character):''' Eduardo Nájera, Oklahoma

Coaching changes 
A number of teams changed coaches throughout the season and after the season ended.

References